Kolokita Cove (‘Zaliv Kolokita’ \'za-liv ko-lo-'ki-ta\) is the 2.7 km wide embayment indenting for 1.55 km the northwest coast of Alexander Island in Antarctica. It is entered east of the coastal point formed by Hopkins Ridge and west of Piyanets Ridge, and has its head fed by Coulter Glacier. The feature is named after Kolokita Point on the Bulgarian Black Sea Coast.

Location

Maps
 British Antarctic Territory. Scale 1:200000 topographic map. DOS 610 – W 69 70. Tolworth, UK, 1971
 Antarctic Digital Database (ADD). Scale 1:250000 topographic map of Antarctica. Scientific Committee on Antarctic Research (SCAR). Since 1993, regularly upgraded and updated

References
 Bulgarian Antarctic Gazetteer. Antarctic Place-names Commission. (details in Bulgarian, basic data in English)
 Kolokita Cove. SCAR Composite Gazetteer of Antarctica

External links
 Kolokita Cove. Copernix satellite image

Bodies of water of Alexander Island
Landforms of Alexander Island
Bulgaria and the Antarctic